Stereochemistry, a subdiscipline of chemistry, involves the study of the relative spatial arrangement of atoms that form the structure of molecules and their manipulation. The study of stereochemistry focuses on the relationships between stereoisomers, which by definition have the same molecular formula and sequence of bonded atoms (constitution), but differ in the geometric positioning of the atoms in space. For this reason, it is also known as 3D chemistry—the prefix "stereo-" means "three-dimensionality".

Stereochemistry spans the entire spectrum of organic, inorganic, biological, physical and especially supramolecular chemistry. Stereochemistry includes methods for determining and describing these relationships; the effect on the physical or biological properties these relationships impart upon the molecules in question, and the manner in which these relationships influence the reactivity of the molecules in question (dynamic stereochemistry).

History
It was not until after the observations of certain molecular phenomena that stereochemical principles were developed. In 1815, Jean-Baptiste Biot's observation of optical activity marked the beginning of organic stereochemistry history. He observed that organic molecules were able to rotate the plane of polarized light in a solution or in the gaseous phase. Despite Biot's discoveries, Louis Pasteur is commonly described as the first stereochemist, having observed in 1842 that salts of tartaric acid collected from wine production vessels could rotate the plane of polarized light, but that salts from other sources did not. This property, the only physical property in which the two types of tartrate salts differed, is due to optical isomerism. In 1874, Jacobus Henricus van 't Hoff and Joseph Le Bel explained optical activity in terms of the tetrahedral arrangement of the atoms bound to carbon. Kekulé used tetrahedral models earlier in 1862 but never published these; Emanuele Paternò probably knew of these but was the first to draw and discuss three dimensional structures, such as of 1,2-dibromoethane in the Giornale di Scienze Naturali ed Economiche in 1869. The term "chiral" was introduced by Lord Kelvin in 1904. Arthur Robertson Cushny, Scottish Pharmacologist, in 1908, first offered a definite example of a bioactivity difference between enantiomers of a chiral molecule viz. (-)-Adrenaline is two times more potent than the (±)- form as a vasoconstrictor and in 1926 laid the foundation for chiral pharmacology/stereo-pharmacology (biological relations of optically isomeric substances). Later in 1966, the Cahn-Ingold-Prelog nomenclature or Sequence rule was devised to assign absolute configuration to stereogenic/chiral center (R- and S- notation)  and extended to be applied across olefinic bonds (E- and Z- notation).

Significance
Cahn–Ingold–Prelog priority rules are part of a system for describing a molecule's stereochemistry. They rank the atoms around a stereocenter in a standard way, allowing the relative position of these atoms in the molecule to be described unambiguously. A Fischer projection is a simplified way to depict the stereochemistry around a stereocenter.

Thalidomide example

Stereochemistry has important applications in the field of medicine, particularly pharmaceuticals. An often cited example of the importance of stereochemistry relates to the thalidomide disaster. Thalidomide is a pharmaceutical drug, first prepared in 1957 in Germany,  prescribed for treating morning sickness in pregnant women. The drug was discovered to be teratogenic, causing serious genetic damage to early embryonic growth and development, leading to limb deformation in babies. Some of the several proposed mechanisms of teratogenicity involve a different biological function for the (R)- and the (S)-thalidomide enantiomers. In the human body however, thalidomide undergoes racemization: even if only one of the two enantiomers is administered as a drug, the other enantiomer is produced as a result of metabolism. Accordingly, it is incorrect to state that one stereoisomer is safe while the other is teratogenic. Thalidomide is currently used for the treatment of other diseases, notably cancer and leprosy. Strict regulations and controls have been enabled to avoid its use by pregnant women and prevent developmental deformations. This disaster was a driving force behind requiring strict testing of drugs before making them available to the public.

Definitions

Many definitions that describe a specific conformer (IUPAC Gold Book) exist, developed by William Klyne and Vladimir Prelog, constituting their Klyne–Prelog system of nomenclature:

 a torsion angle of ±60° is called gauche
 a torsion angle between 0° and ±90° is called syn  (s)
 a torsion angle between ±90° and 180° is called anti (a)
 a torsion angle between 30° and 150° or between –30° and –150° is called clinal
 a torsion angle between 0° and 30° or 150° and 180° is called periplanar (p)
 a torsion angle between 0° to 30° is called synperiplanar or syn- or cis-conformation (sp)
 a torsion angle between 30° to 90° and –30° to –90° is called synclinal or gauche or skew (sc)
 a torsion angle between 90° to 150°, and –90° to –150° is called  anticlinal (ac)
 a torsion angle between ±150° to 180° is called  antiperiplanar or anti or trans (ap).

Torsional strain results from resistance to twisting about a bond.

Types
 AtropisomerismAn energetic form of axial chirality. This form of chirality derives from differential substitution about a bond, commonly between two sp²-hydridized atoms.
 Cis–trans isomerismAlso referred to as geometric isomers, these compounds have different configurations due to the inflexible structure of the molecule. Two requirements must be met for a molecule to present cis-trans isomerism:1. Rotation within the molecule must be restricted.2. Two nonidentical groups must be on each doubly bonded carbon atom.
 Conformational isomerismThis form of isomerism is also referred to as conformers, rotational isomers, and rotamers. Conformational isomerism is produced by rotation about the Single bond.
 DiastereomersThese stereoisomers are non-image, non-identical. Diastereomers occur when the stereoisomers of a compound have differing configurations at corresponding stereocenters.
 EnantiomersStereoisomers which are nonsuperimposable, mirror images.

See also

 Alkane stereochemistry
 Chiral resolution, which often involves crystallization
 Chirality (chemistry) (R/S, d/l)
 Chiral switch
 Skeletal formula#Stereochemistry which describes how stereochemistry is denoted in skeletal formulae.
 Solid-state chemistry
 VSEPR theory

References

 
Chemistry
Jacobus Henricus van 't Hoff
1874 in science